Committee on Statistics of Ministry of National Economy of the Republic of Kazakhstan - is the empowered structure, forming and realizing State policy in the field of statistics, work out and implement programs to perfect the statistics in the Republic of Kazakhstan.

Functions and goals 
The main objectives are as follows:
 formating of statistical methodology;
 implementation of statistical activities in compliance with the principles of state statistics;
  meet the needs of society, government, and the international community in official statistics.

History

Structure

Central 
On 2020. 290 people.
 Division of national accounts 
 Division of national accounts
 Division of structural statistics
 Division of price statistics
 Division of production and environment statistics
 Division of services and energy statistics
 Division of social and demographic statistics
 Division of labor and standard of living statistics
 Division of statistical registers and classifications
 Division of IT management
 Division of work with users
 Division of finance and documentation support
 Law division
 International statistical cooperation division
 Human resources division
 Subdivision for protection of state secrets
 Division on preparation and holding of national censuses
 Division of control with regard to administrative sources
 Division of statistics of goals and sustainable development

Regional 
on 2020
 Akmola Region statistic department
 Aktobe Region statistic department
 Almaty statistic department
 Almaty Region statistic department
 Nur-Sultan statistic department
 Atyrau Region statistic department
 East Kazakhstan Region statistic department
 Jambyl Region statistic department
 Karaganda Region statistic department
 Kostanay Region statistic department
 Kyzylorda Region statistic department
 Mangystau Region statistic department
 North Kazakhstan Region statistic department
 Pavlodar Region statistic department
 Shymkent statistic department
 Turkistan Region statistic department
 West Kazakhstan Region statistic department

Head and names

Subordinate organizations 
The Republican State Enterprise "Information and Computing Center of the Agency of the Republic of Kazakhstan on Statistics" is subordinate to the Agency of the Republic of Kazakhstan on Statistics.

Censuses

References

Citations 

Statistics
National statistical services